Masirana is a genus of Asian leptonetids that was first described by T. Komatsu in 1942.

Species
 it contains twenty-three species and three subspecies from Japan, Korea, and Okinawa:
Masirana abensis (Kobayashi, 1973) – Japan
Masirana akahanei Komatsu, 1963 – Japan
Masirana akiyoshiensis (Oi, 1958) – Japan
Masirana a. imperatoria Komatsu, 1974 – Japan
Masirana a. kagekiyoi Komatsu, 1974 – Japan
Masirana a. primocreata Komatsu, 1974 – Japan
Masirana bandoi (Nishikawa, 1986) – Japan
Masirana bonghwaensis Seo, 2015 – Korea
Masirana chibusana (Irie, 2000) – Japan
Masirana cinevacea Kishida, 1942 (type) – Japan
Masirana flabelli Seo, 2015 – Korea
Masirana glabra (Komatsu, 1957) – Japan
Masirana ilweolensis Seo, 2015 – Korea
Masirana kawasawai (Komatsu, 1970) – Japan
Masirana kinoshitai (Irie, 2000) – Japan
Masirana kosodeensis Komatsu, 1963 – Japan
Masirana kuramotoi Komatsu, 1974 – Japan
Masirana kusunoensis Irie & Ono, 2010 – Japan
Masirana kyokoae Yaginuma, 1972 – Japan
Masirana longimana Yaginuma, 1970 – Japan
Masirana longipalpis Komatsu, 1972 – Japan (Okinawa)
Masirana mizonokuchiensis Irie & Ono, 2005 – Japan
Masirana nippara Komatsu, 1957 – Japan
Masirana silvicola (Kobayashi, 1973) – Japan
Masirana taioensis Irie & Ono, 2005 – Japan
Masirana taraensis Irie & Ono, 2005 – Japan

See also
 List of Leptonetidae species

References

Araneomorphae genera
Leptonetidae
Taxa named by Kyukichi Kishida
Spiders of Asia